The Kids is a 2015 Taiwanese drama film written and directed by Sunny Yu.  It stars Wu Chien-ho and Wen Chen-ling as teenage parents who must find a way to provide for their baby.

Plot 
Sixteen-year-old Bao-li falls in love with older student Jia-jia.  After they begin dating, Jia-jia becomes pregnant and gives birth to a child for whom they can not afford to provide.  Though they at first are able to survive with the help of friends and family, Bao-li turns to robbery when his mother gambles away their savings.

Cast 
 Wu Chien-ho as Bao-li
 Wen Chen-ling as Jia-jia
 Yang Chi as Bao-li's mother
 Bi Zhi Gang as Uncle Liu
 Shirley Chien as Aunty Liu
 Kao Meng Chieh
 May Hong as A-qin
 Lawrence Ko as Zhe-wei
 Yang Jing as Zhang-qing
 Roger Huang as Jia-jia's father

Production 
The film was based on true events.  Writer-director Sunny Yu says that she made to film to understand how a young father could be pressured into robbing people to support his family.

Release 
The international premiere was at the Tokyo International Film Festival, where it competed in the Asian Future competition.

Reception 
Richard Kuipers of Variety called it "an engaging and convincing drama" with good acting, directing, and scoring.

References

External links 
 

2015 films
2015 drama films
Taiwanese drama films
2010s Mandarin-language films
Teenage pregnancy in film